Heartland FM is a community owned radio station based in Pitlochry, broadcasting to the Highland Perthshire area.

One of the longest serving community owned radio stations in Scotland, Heartland FM has been broadcasting since 1992. The station covers the Highland Perthshire area, with a focus on local programming, by drawing on members of the community to present programmes and provide technical backup. The station operates with a charitable status, governed by a board of trustees, and funded by a hybrid of grant and advertisement money.

History

Heartland FM started broadcasting in 1992, when it was set up to serve the Highland Perthshire area which, at that time, did not have access to FM quality broadcasts, and only limited analogue television. Broadcasting on a part-time basis from the outset, the station now runs a full schedule every day of the week.

Since 2019, the station has developed as part of a larger multimedia platform, which also supports IRIS, a digital community magazine; and a website which provides a daily news service.

Programming

Heartland FM broadcasts a range of programming throughout the day and week, with a breakfast programme every morning, as well as afternoon and drive time slots.
Among the daytime programming, the station also features a range of specialist shows, focusing on country music, rock and roll, traditional Scottish music and Scottish political news.

Awards

Heartland FM has been the recipient of numerous awards and nominations, including Best Radio Station 2012 at the Scottish New Music Awards.

The station also won the silver award for Community Show of the Year in 2019, and was nominated for Arts & Creative Radio of the Year in 2020, at the Community Radio Awards.

In 2021, Heartland FM won the silver award for Station of the Year at the Community Radio Awards, as well as the bronze award for Live Event or Outside Broadcast of the Year, in recognition of their coverage of the 2021 Scottish Parliament election. Journalist Ashleigh Keenan-Bryce won the gold award for Best Newcomer to Radio, while presenter Katherine Lilley won the silver award for Best Female Presenter.

References

External links

 Heartland Multimedia
 Ofcom: Heartland FM

Community radio stations
Radio stations established in 1992
Radio stations in Scotland